Time of Your Life may refer to:

Literature 

 The Time of Your Life, a 1939 play by William Saroyan
 Time of Your Life (novel), based on the Doctor Who TV series

Film and television 

 Time of Your Life (American TV series), an American drama series, starring Jennifer Love Hewitt
 Time of Your Life (1963 TV series), a 1963–1965 Canadian television youth variety show that aired on CBC
 Time of Your Life (1988 TV series), a 1988–1989 Canadian soap opera television series created by Harry Jakobs and Maryse Wilder that aired on CFCF
 The Time of Your Life (film), a 1948 adaptation of the William Saroyan play starring James Cagney
 The Time of Your Life (TV series), a 2007 British drama series, starring Genevieve O’Reilly
 The Time of Your Life (Playhouse 90), a television adaptation of the William Saroyan play

Music 

 "Good Riddance (Time of Your Life)", a Green Day song from the 1997 album Nimrod
 "The Time of Your Life", a song composed and performed by Randy Newman from the soundtrack of the animated movie A Bug's Life
 "Time of Your Life", a 2012 song by Kid Ink from the album Up & Away
 "Time of Your Life", a song by Mariah Carey
 "Time of Your Life", a song by Stephanie Mills from her 1985 self-titled album

Other 

 "Time of Your Life" (Buffy comic), a story arc in the Buffy the Vampire Slayer Season Eight comic book series

See also
 "Times of Your Life", a 1975 Paul Anka song
Time of Our Lives (disambiguation)
The Time of My Life (disambiguation)